Aatolana rapax is a species of crustaceans in the family Cirolanidae, first described by Niel L. Bruce in 1993. 

It is benthic shrimp found in tropical waters at depths of 150 m to 200 m off the coasts of Papua New Guinea, Western Australia, the Northern Territory, and Queensland.

References

External links 

 Aatolana rapax occurrence data from GBIF

Cymothoida
Crustaceans of Australia
Crustaceans described in 1993
Taxa named by Niel L. Bruce